Plantago serraria is a species of plants in the family Plantaginaceae.

Sources

References 

serraria
Flora of Malta